The "Universidad Bicentenaria de Aragua" (UBA) is a private institution of higher education in Turmero, Aragua State, Venezuela.

Undergraduate degrees offered:

Engineering Faculty

Systems engineering
Electrical engineering

Faculty of Management and Social Sciences

Administration
Public Accounting
Social Communication
Psychology

Faculty of Political and Legal Sciences

Law

Private universities and colleges in Venezuela
Educational institutions established in 1986
1986 establishments in Venezuela